The 1990 Kansas City Chiefs season was the franchise's 21st season in the National Football League, the 28th as the Kansas City Chiefs and the 31st overall. The team improved from an 8–7–1 record to an 11–5 record and Wild Card spot in the 1991 playoffs. In Marty Schottenheimer's first playoff appearance with the Chiefs, they lost to the Miami Dolphins 17–16 in the Wild Card round. Starting with the home opener, the Chiefs began an NFL-record 19 consecutive seasons with every home game sold out. The streak was finally broken in the final home game of the 2009 Kansas City Chiefs season versus Cleveland.

Season notes 
The success of the 1989 season carried into 1990, and the Chiefs put together a successful season to return to the playoffs for only the second time since 1971. The season began on August 4 when Buck Buchanan, a key ingredient of the Chiefs' 1969 Super Bowl championship season was inducted into the Pro Football Hall of Fame.

On opening day, The Chiefs beat the Minnesota Vikings 24–21. On September 17, Stephone Paige catches 10 passes for 206 yards, but the Chiefs still lost to the Denver Broncos, 24–23 on Monday Night Football.

On October 14, Barry Word rushes for a team-record 200 yards against the Detroit Lions at Arrowhead. Kansas City won 43–24 to give the Chiefs a 4–2 record. Word would eventually gain 1,021 yards rushing for the season while Paige caught 65 passes for 1,021 yards. Quarterback Steve DeBerg had his best season ever as a Chief as he passed for 3,444 yards and 23 touchdowns.

On November 11, Derrick Thomas who would get 20 quarterback sacks for the year, sacked Seattle Seahawks quarterback Dave Krieg an NFL-record seven sacks. On the game's last play, Derrick nearly had his 8th sack, but Krieg eluded him and threw a game-winning touchdown as the Seahawks won 17–16. Derrick Thomas later said himself that, "The thing I most remember about that game, is the sack I didn't get, that's the one that still haunts me." The great Derrick Thomas' record of seven sacks in one game is now seen as one of NFL's most "unbreakable records".

On December 9, the Chiefs had two big fourth-down calls and scored two touchdowns. Chiefs coach Marty Schottenheimer let his team make two big plays that ultimately led to Kansas City's 31–20 win over the Denver Broncos, which clinched a playoff spot.

The first big play was a fourth-and-goal at the Denver 1-yard line, and Barry Word carried the ball into the end zone to give the Chiefs a 17–13 lead. The second fourth-down attempt resulted in a 27-yard touchdown pass from Steve DeBerg to Robb Thomas and put the game away in the fourth quarter. DeBerg passed for 254 yards and three touchdowns in the game. Kansas City trailed 13–10 at the half but scored 21 second-half points to take control of the game.

The win improved their record to 9–4 and control of the AFC West Race. However, the next week the Chiefs lost to Houston, putting the Raiders Back into First place. The Chiefs won their next game at San Diego to Clinch an AFC playoff spot. The Chiefs then defeated the Chicago Bears 21-19 to finish 11–5, the team's best record since 1971. The Raiders held onto first winning in the final week. Defense carried the Chiefs to the playoffs thanks to Pro Bowlers Derrick Thomas, Albert Lewis and Kevin Ross.

Next was the Miami Dolphins in the AFC Wild-Card Playoff Game, a game they would lead 16-3 only to go on to lose, 17–16. Kicker Nick Lowery Missed a 52-yard FG in the final seconds that would have won the game.

Offseason

NFL draft

Undrafted free agents

Personnel

Staff

Roster

Preseason

Regular season

Schedule 

Note: Intra-division opponents are in bold text.

Game summaries

Week 2: at Denver Broncos

Week 14: vs. Denver Broncos

Standings

Postseason

In a scene that would be repeated throughout the 1990s the Chiefs had a great regular season but failed miserably in the post-season. In the Wild Card playoff game, the Chiefs blew a 16–3 lead as the Dolphins scored two touchdowns to take a lead. The Chiefs had one last chance for a win, but Christian Okoye's long run was called back due to a questionable holding call. Kicker Nick Lowery, who had 139 points all season and a Pro Bowl berth missed a 52-yard field goal, ending the Chiefs season.

Schedule

Game summaries

AFC Wild Card Playoffs: at (4) Miami Dolphins

With 2:28 left in the game, the Dolphins capped an 85-yard drive with quarterback Dan Marino's winning 12-yard touchdown pass to wide receiver Mark Clayton.

References 

Kansas City Chiefs
Kansas City Chiefs seasons
Kansas